Cerylon histeroides is a species of Cerylonidae native to Europe.

References

Cerylonidae
Beetles described in 1792
Beetles of Europe